The National Register for Sex Offenders (NRSO) is a sex offender registry in South Africa which contains the details of people convicted of sexual offences against children or mentally disabled people. Those listed on the register are prohibited from working with children or the mentally disabled, and from adopting children or acting as foster parents. The register is not accessible to the public.

The NRSO was created by Chapter 6 of the Criminal Law (Sexual Offences and Related Matters) Amendment Act, 2007. It came into being on 30 June 2009 under the administration of the Department of Justice and Constitutional Development. Details of offenders convicted before the creation of the register were collected from existing records held by various government departments, while details of offenders convicted since the creation of the register are added by the convicting court.

References

External links
 Department of Justice and Constitutional Development: National Register for Sex Offenders
 Criminal Law (Sexual Offences and Related Matters) Amendment Act 32 of 2007

Sex offender registration
Sex crimes in South Africa